The Apostolic Church is a New Apostolic church located at 35 Elena Doamna Street in Iași, Romania.

The church was built at the beginning of the 20th century. It is listed as a historic monument by Romania's Ministry of Culture and Religious Affairs.

Notes

Religious buildings and structures in Iași
Historic monuments in Iași County
Protestant churches in Romania